Baalrog is a genus of hubbardiid short-tailed whipscorpions, first described by Monjaraz-Ruedas, Prendini & Francke in 2019.

Species 
, the World Schizomida Catalog accepts the following four species:

 Baalrog firstmani (Rowland, 1973) – Mexico
 Baalrog magico (Monjaraz-Ruedas & Francke, 2018) – Mexico
 Baalrog sbordonii (Brignoli, 1973) – Mexico
 Baalrog yacato Monjaraz-Ruedas, Prendini & Francke, 2019 – Mexico

References 

Schizomida genera
Arthropods of Mexico
Animals described in 2019